John Imrie Gillespie (16 January 1879 – 5 December 1943), known as Jimmy Gillespie, was a Scottish international rugby union player, who played for  and the Lions.

Rugby Union career

Amateur career

At club level he played for Edinburgh Academicals.

Provincial career

He was capped by Edinburgh District in 1898.

International career

Gillespie was selected for the 1903 British Lions tour to South Africa and finished the tour as the top Test scorer for the touring team. He played in 19 matches during the tour including all three test games against South Africa. He scored 13 conversions and a single try on the tour, and amassed four points in the first Test, the British failing to score in the second and third tests.

Referee career

He later became a successful referee, including two  vs  internationals, one in 1907, and the other in 1911.

Outside of rugby

Gillespie was a chartered accountant.

Bibliography
 Bath, Richard (ed.) The Scotland Rugby Miscellany (Vision Sports Publishing Ltd, 2007 )
 Godwin, Terry Complete Who's Who of International Rugby (Cassell, 1987)
 Massie, Allan A Portrait of Scottish Rugby (Polygon, Edinburgh)

Notes

1879 births
1943 deaths
Scottish rugby union players
Scotland international rugby union players
Rugby union players from Edinburgh
British & Irish Lions rugby union players from Scotland
Scottish accountants
Scottish rugby union referees
Edinburgh Academicals rugby union players
Edinburgh District (rugby union) players